Kanbalu (also spelt Kantbalu) is a town in Shwebo District, Sagaing Division, in Myanmar.  It is the administrative seat for Kanbalu Township.  Kanbalu is on the main Burmese north-south railroad between Sagaing and Myitkyina. As of 2014, it had a population of 25,022

History
Its railyards were bombed by the Allies during World War II.

Economy
The military-run Myanmar Economic Corporation operates two factories, manufacturing sugar and menthol, in Kantbalu. The sugar factory is a joint venture with Thai-owned Sutech Engineering. Kanbalu is also home to the  Thaphanseik hydropower plant on the Mu River, a $20-million project financed by the China Import and Export Bank.

Notes

External links
"Kanbalu, Burma" 
"Kanbalu Map — Satellite Images of Kanbalu" Maplandia.com

Township capitals of Myanmar
Populated places in Sagaing Region